Family Circus is a 2001 Telugu-language comedy film written and directed by Teja. It stars Jagapati Babu, Rajendra Prasad, Roja, Kanchi Kaul, and music composed by R. P. Patnaik. It was produced by Sunkara Madhu Murali under the Melody Multimedia banner. The film was recorded as Average at the box office.

Plot
The film begins on Subramanyam / Subbu a simpleton works as a manager in a firm. He marries a no-nonsense lady Durga and the couple adopts Subbu's deceased sister's two sons. Thereafter, Durga gives birth to twins, the imps make their life miserable with their mischief for which Subbu has to vacate too many houses. So, Subbu decides to buy a house in a locality full of bizarre characters that include a retired army officer Lance naik Bhagath, a loud-mouthed neighbour Santharam, and some demented feminists. Right now, things get worse when Subbu rents a portion of his house to a person Pataudi. Later Subbu realizes his mistake after seeing Pataudi's family, which is the most dysfunctional that one can ever imagine. Pataudi's family contains wife Kantham a hardcore virago, two more strong imps, and a sister-in-law Sujatha a teenage girl. Sujatha is infatuated towards Subbu and stalks him day and night. Parallelly, Babloo a person who aspires to love Sujatha threatens Subbu with his gang. Here, the quandary creates turmoil and turbulence. The rest of the story is a comic tale that how Subbu discards from these problems.

Cast

Jagapati Babu as Subramanyaaam / Subbu 
Rajendra Prasad as Pathodi 
Roja as Durga 
Kanchi Kaul as Sujatha
Kota Srinivasa Rao as Lance naik Bhagath
Brahmanandam as Dr.Anand
Sudhakar as Kaasi
M. S. Narayana as Nani
Sunil as Bhimavaram Rowdy
Tanikella Bharani as Fishing Inspector
Dharmavarapu Subramanyam as Santharam
Babu Mohan
Giri Babu as Krishna Rao
Babloo as Babloo
Ananth as Bar Waiter
Chitti Babu as Bar Waiter 
Gundu Hanumantha Rao as Balloon Seller 
Gundu Sudarshan as Rajesh Khanna
Kallu Chidambaram as Chidambara Sastry
Junior Relangi as House Owner
Jenny
Narsing Yadav as Chari 
Jhansi as Kantham
Rama Prabha as Bamma
Rajitha as Doctor
Ramya Sri
Madhumani
Madhurisen as Durga's friend

Soundtrack

Music composed by R. P. Patnaik. Lyrics written by Kulashekar. Music released on SNEHA Music Company.

References

2001 films
2001 comedy films
Indian comedy films
Films directed by Teja (film director)
2000s Telugu-language films
Films scored by R. P. Patnaik